I, Pharaoh is a live album by composer, bandleader and keyboardist Sun Ra and his Arkestra recorded around 1979 and released on his El Saturn label.

Reception

The Allmusic review by Sean Westergaard states "I, Pharaoh has some fine material, but the less than perfect sound quality detracts somewhat from the experience ... pieces like this, where Ra blends history and myth, are always interesting. I, Pharaoh is a decent album, but probably not worth the prohibitive cost of most Saturn LP's to all but the most serious Sun Ra fans".

Track listing
All compositions by Sun Ra
 "Rumpelstiltskin" – 4:15
 "Images" – 7:15
 "I, Pharaoh" – 15:14

Personnel
Sun Ra – piano, organ, synthesizer, recitation
Marshall Allen – alto saxophone, flute, piccolo
John Gilmore – tenor saxophone, percussion
James Jacson – bassoon, flute, percussion
Danny Ray Thompson – baritone saxophone, flute
Eloe Omoe – bass clarinet, flute
Steve Clarke  – electric bass
Richard Williams – bass
Luqman Ali – drums
Atakatune – percussion
June Tyson – vocals

References 

Sun Ra live albums
El Saturn Records live albums
1980 live albums